Rock candy is a type of confection composed of relatively large sugar crystals.

Rock candy may also refer to:

 "Rock Candy", song by Montrose
 Rock Candy (album), by Orianthi
 Rock Candy Records, record label

See also 
 Rock (confectionery), cylindrical British boiled candy